Scarecrow and Mrs. King is an American television series that aired from October 3, 1983, to September 10, 1987, on CBS.

The show starred Kate Jackson and Bruce Boxleitner, as divorced housewife Amanda King and top-level "Agency" operative Lee Stetson, who begin an unusual partnership and eventual romance after encountering one another in a train station.

Plot
Amanda King is a divorced housewife who lives with her mother, Dotty, and her young sons, Philip and Jamie.

One morning, Agency operative Lee Stetson, code-named "Scarecrow", hands her a package while he is being pursued. He instructs her to "give it to the man in the red hat", but she is unable to complete the assignment, as there are many men in fezzes in the train car at the time. Scarecrow later has to track her down to recover the package, inadvertently getting her involved with his case. When Stetson is captured by his pursuers and marked for elimination, King ends up solving the secret behind the package, finding and rescuing Stetson, and even taking down their opponents, thereby getting introduced to the Agency.

Inquisitive, King seeks to learn more about the organization and ends up working for them, first in an office role and later receiving training to become a full agent, while keeping her new job a secret from her family. She works under Stetson's boss, Billy Melrose, and with dismissive fellow agent Francine Desmond. Stetson and King work together even though he is initially reluctant to work with the "rookie" but eventually they become a good team.

The pair travel to places like Germany and England and help each other as they pose as other people, sometimes posing as husband and wife. Escapades involving cruise ships and getting "married" are some of their assignments, and the KGB or other enemies of the United States are always involved. Amanda's ex-husband, Joe King, is still friendly with Amanda and is later suspected of murder.

Stetson and King develop a friendship that turns into a romantic relationship. While many suitors for King and Stetson appear, in the end they stay with each other. Stetson professes his love for King before going into hiding from the Agency, and he then proposes after her kidnapping. However, because of concerns for the safety of King's family, they must keep the marriage secret from their employer, friends, and families.

Cast

Main cast
 Kate Jackson as Amanda King
 Bruce Boxleitner as Lee Stetson ("Scarecrow")
 Beverly Garland as Dotty West (Amanda's mother)
 Paul Stout as Philip King (Amanda's son)
 Greg Morton as Jamie King (Amanda's son)
 Mel Stewart as Billy Melrose
 Martha Smith as Francine Desmond

Guest cast
Hildegard Knef, Russian princess targeted by assassins, 1.21, "Waiting for Godorsky" (credited as Hildegard Neff)
Jean Stapleton, British spy Lady Emily Farnsworth, two episodes, 2.4, "The Legend of Das Geisterschloss", and 2.11, "The Three Faces of Emily"
Raleigh Bond, information man T.P. Aquinas, 11 episodes
Howard Duff, Stetson's mentor Captain Harry Thornton, two episodes, 3.4, "Tail of the Dancing Weasel", and 4.22, "The Khrushchev List"
James Cromwell, Stetson's nemesis Gregory, two episodes, 3.4, "Tail of the Dancing Weasel", and 3.18, "Wrong Number"
Arlen Dean Snyder, Colonel Robert Clayton, the tough uncle who raised Stetson after his parents' death, episode 2.15, "A Relative Situation"
Thomas Babson, King's weatherman boyfriend, Dean, three episodes, 1.1, "The First Time", 1.5, "The ACM Kid", and 2.16, "Life of the Party" 
John Saxon, Agency man Dirk Fredericks, two episodes, 1.1, "The First Time", and 1.8, "Saved by the Bells"
John Rhys-Davies, Lord Bromfield, episode 2.8, "Affair at Bromfield Hall"
Ian Wolfe, Rupert Simpson, episode 3.15, "The Pharaoh's Engineer"

Episodes

Release
The TV series aired weekly from October 3, 1983, on CBS until September 10, 1987.

Home media
The entire series was made available for online viewing through AOL's SlashControl service from January until August 2009.

As of June 2011, the entire series is currently available for online viewing through Amazon Prime Video.

Warner Home Video has released all four seasons on DVD in Region 1.

Reception
Scarecrow and Mrs. King won a 1986 Emmy Award for "Outstanding Achievement in Music Composition for a Series (Dramatic Underscore)" for the episode "We're Off to See the Wizard". It was nominated for multiple awards during its four-year run, including two Emmy award nominations in 1985 for "Best Performance by an Actress in a TV-Series" and "Outstanding Achievement in Costuming" and another nomination in 1986 for "Outstanding Achievement in Costuming for a Series". It was nominated for a 1985 Golden Globe award for "Outstanding Cinematography for a Series" for the episode "D.O.A.: Delirious On Arrival", and in 1988 the American Society of Cinematographers nominated it for the "Outstanding Achievement in Cinematography in Regular Series" award. Paul Stout was nominated for a Young Artist Award in 1985 for "Best Young Supporting Actor in a Daytime or Nighttime Drama" and "Best Young Actor Starring in a Television Drama Series".

Scarecrow and Mrs. King finished both the 1983–1984 (18.3) and 1984–1985 seasons (17.1) as the 20th most watched program on television. The program finished the 1985–1986 season (17.4) as the 28th most watched program on television. For the 1986–87 season, CBS moved the series from Mondays to Friday nights, and the ratings slipped to 41st place (14.6) for the season. Despite being higher-rated than some renewed series (Simon & Simon and The Twilight Zone), CBS chose to cancel Scarecrow and Mrs. King.

References

External links

1983 American television series debuts
1987 American television series endings
American action television series
CBS original programming
English-language television shows
Espionage television series
Fictional couples
Television series by Warner Bros. Television Studios
Television series set in fictional countries
Television shows set in Washington, D.C.
Television duos